Lepreau is a Canadian rural community in Charlotte County, New Brunswick.

Lepreau  River and point.  Of uncertain origin-probably a corruption of an earlier French designation, lapereau, "little rabbit", or le proe.  Occurs as Pte. aux Napreaux (Franquelin, 1686).

History

Notable people

See also
List of communities in New Brunswick

References

Communities in Charlotte County, New Brunswick